Émile Guérinel (3 June 1929 – 2 February 2014) was a French racing cyclist. He rode in the 1953 Tour de France.

References

1929 births
2014 deaths
French male cyclists
Place of birth missing